Changing Ends is an upcoming British sitcom for ITVX. It is a semi autobiographical series from comedian Alan Carr about growing up in Northampton during the 1980s, the son of a professional football manager.

Synopsis
Graham Carr was a former top-flight professional footballer who was the manager of Northampton Town F.C. when they won the Football League Fourth Division title in 1986-87. The East Midlands in Thatcher's Britain however may have been felt very different as seen through the eyes of his son, a young man who feels less Match of the Day and more Miss Marple, more George Michael than Gary Lineker.

Cast
 Oliver Savell as Young Alan
 Alan Carr as Older Alan
 Shaun Dooley as Graham Carr
 Nancy Sullivan as Christine Carr
 Taylor Fay as Gary Carr
 Rourke Mooney as Charlie 
 Gabby Best as Angela
 Harry Peacock as Nigel
 David Mumeni as Mr Chapman
 Michael Socha as Adam.

Production
In February 2021 Carr and Baby Cow Productions began auditioning young actors to play himself in a future sitcom that they were developing together. A non broadcast pilot was made with BBC Studios in February 2022. A six-part series was commissioned by ITVX in November 2022, with Carr co-writing the series with Simon Carlyle and production by Baby Cow with Oliver Savell announced to be playing the young Carr. Executive producers are Sarah Monteith, Rupert Majendie and Danny Julian for Baby Cow, alongside Carr and Carlyle. In January 2023 it was confirmed that joining the cast are Shaun Dooley and Nancy Sullivan as Alan's parents Christine and Graham Carr, with Taylor Fay playing his younger brother Gary. The family's neighbours are Rourke Mooney and Gabby Best as Charlie and Angela, and Harry Peacock as Nigel, David Mumeni as Mr Chapman and Michael Socha as Adam. That same month, filming was revealed to have started on the series on location in Northampton.

Broadcast
The series will premiere on ITVX before broadcast on ITV1 at a later date.

References

External links

Upcoming comedy television series
English-language television shows
Coming-of-age television shows
Bisexuality-related television series
Gay-related television shows
Television shows filmed in England
Television series set in the 1980s
Television shows set in Northamptonshire
ITV sitcoms
ITV comedy